Alexander Colvin Ainslie (1833–1903) was Archdeacon of Taunton  from 1896 until his death on 5 June 1903.

Ainslie was educated at University College, Oxford, and ordained in 1854. After a curacy at Sopworth he held incumbencies at Corfe (1854–1871), Henstridge (1871–1883, Langport (1883-1891) and Over Stowey (1891–1896).

Notes

1833 births
Alumni of University College, Oxford
Archdeacons of Taunton
1903 deaths